Zhang Yu (born 8 April 1971) is a retired female Chinese hurdler. She represented her country at the 1992 Summer Olympics.

Her personal best time is 12.64 seconds, achieved in September 1993 in Beijing at the 7th Chinese National Games. This is the current Chinese record.

National titles
National Games of the People's Republic of China
100 m hurdles: 1993
Chinese Athletics Championships
100 m hurdles: 1991, 1992, 1993, 1994, 1996, 1997

International competitions

References

1971 births
Living people
Chinese female hurdlers
Olympic athletes of China
Athletes (track and field) at the 1992 Summer Olympics
Asian Games medalists in athletics (track and field)
Athletes (track and field) at the 1994 Asian Games
World Athletics Championships athletes for China
Asian Games bronze medalists for China
Medalists at the 1994 Asian Games